The 2012–13 Arminia Bielefeld season is the 108th season in the club's football history.

Review and events

In 2012–13 the club plays in the 3. Liga, the third tier of German football. It is the club's second season in this league, having been relegated from the 2. Fußball-Bundesliga in 2011.

The club also took part in the 2012–13 edition of the DFB-Pokal, the German Cup,  where it reached the second round and will face Bundesliga side Bayer Leverkusen next.

Arminia Bielefeld also takes part in the 2012–13 edition of the Westphalia Cup, having reached the third round after a 3–1 win over FC Gütersloh in the second round.

Matches

Legend

3. Liga

DFB-Pokal

Squad

Squad, matches played and goals scored

Minutes played

Starting 11

Bookings

Notes

References

External links
 2012–13 Arminia Bielefeld season at Weltfussball.de 
 2012–13 Arminia Bielefeld season at kicker.de 
 2012–13 Arminia Bielefeld season at Fussballdaten.de 

Arminia Bielefeld
Arminia Bielefeld seasons